Emmanuel Osuigwe (born 6 April 1952) is a Nigerian footballer. He competed in the men's tournament at the 1980 Summer Olympics.

References

1952 births
Living people
Nigerian footballers
Nigeria international footballers
Olympic footballers of Nigeria
Footballers at the 1980 Summer Olympics
Place of birth missing (living people)
Association football forwards